The 1992 Big League World Series took place from August 14–22 in Fort Lauderdale, Florida, United States. Host Broward County, Florida defeated Maracaibo, Venezuela twice in the championship game.

Teams

Results

References

Big League World Series
Big League World Series